The Røldal Tunnel is a road tunnel in Ullensvang Municipality in Vestland county, Norway. The  tunnel is part of the European route E134 highway and it connects the village of Horda in the Røldal area with the Seljestad area on the other side of the mountains to the west. The tunnel was opened on 21 February 1964 and for four years after its opening, it was the longest road tunnel in Norway (until the Haukeli Tunnel opened).

References

Ullensvang
Road tunnels in Vestland